Aigaleo B.C. (alternate spelling: Egaleo) is a Greek professional basketball team that is located in Aigaleo, Greece, which is a suburb of Athens. The club's full name is Aigaleo A.O. B.C. (Greek: Αιγάλεω A.O. KAE). Aigaleo currently plays in the third-tier level of Greek basketball, the Greek B Basket League.

History
The team's parent athletic club was founded in 1931, as Ierapolis Athletic Union (Greek: Αθλητική Ένωσις Ιεράπολι), and the basketball division of the athletic organization was founded in 1956, by Alexandros Stavropoulos. Although the basketball department was founded in 1956, it took the club exactly fifty years to participate in the Greek First Division, which is the highest professional basketball league in Greece, in the 2006–07 season. During the 1950s and 1960s, the team remained in the lowest local (third) division, until 1971, when it qualified for the higher league, because of a new categorical system.

In 1973 and 1974, Aigaleo B.C. won two league promotions, and finally took part in the 3rd-tier level Greek B Basket League (1974–75, 1975–76 seasons). For the next 12 years, the team participated in the first local league (A E.S.K.A.), except in the 1981–82 season, when it was in the B E.S.K.A., after 1981's relegation. During the late 1980s and early 1990s, Aigaleo B.C. participated in the 4th-tier level Greek C Basket League, where it played six seasons in total, but was it relegated again to the local league in 1994.

In 1997, Aigaleo won the A E.S.K.A. championship, and after two years, in 1999, Aigaleo B.C. returned to the Greek B League, where it played for six seasons in total. In 2004, Aigaleo B.C. won the Greek B League championship, and after having a short presence in the 2nd-tier level Greek A2 Basket League, it was promoted to the top-tier level Greek Basket League, in 2006. From 1999 to 2006, the team was coached by Dimitrios Karvelas, and after him, Thanasis Skourtopoulos took that position.

Arena
Aigaleo plays its home games at the 2,000 seat Aigaleo Stavros Venetis Indoor Hall.

Titles and honors

Domestic competitions
Greek 3rd Division
 Champions (1): (2003–04)

Greek 4th Division
 Champions (3): (1998–99, 2000–01, 2018–19)

League pyramid history

Notable players

Greece
 Stelios Amerikanos
 Nikos Angelopoulos
 Nikos Charalampopoulos
 Vassilis Charalampopoulos
 Athanasios Diamantopoulos
 Ioannis Dimakos
 Andronikos Gizogiannis
 Ioannis Golfinopoulos
 Akis Kallinikidis
 Vangelis Karampoulas
 Giorgos Kassanos
 Ioannis Kolios
 Giorgos Kosmopoulos
 Ioannis Kyriakopoulos
 Giannoulis Larentzakis
 Kostas Leventakos
 Dimitrios Lolas
 Kostas Magkounis
 Spyros Magkounis
 Nikos Michalos
 Iakovos Milentigievits
 Makis Nikolaidis
 Kostas Papageorgiou
 Christos Petrodimopoulos
 Nikos Pettas
 Michalis Polytarchou
 Vangelis Sakellariou
 Dimitrios Sakellariou
 Miloš Šakota
 Vassilis Soulis
 Giorgos Thomopoulos
 Stamatis Villiotis

Europe
 Chris Bracey
 Guido Grunheid
 Dejan Hohler
 Abdurahman Kahrimanović
 Vladimir Krstić
 Robert Maras
 Ninoslav Marjanovic
 Donnie McGrath
 Robert Šarović

USA
 Rashad Anderson
 Keydren Clark
 Anthony Goldwire
 Leemire Goldwire
 DeVon Hardin
 Ibby Jaaber
 Andrae Patterson
 Donell Taylor

Head coaches

 Nikolaos Terkesidis
 Alexandros Kontovounisios
 Georgios Amerikanos
 Georgios Trontzos
 Pavlos Diakoulas
 Loukas Kontos
 Serafeim Potosoglou
 Giorgos Nikitopoulos
 Aris Raftopoulos
 Pavlos Stamelos
 Argiris Kambouris
 Steve Giatzoglou
 Giorgos Zevgolis
 Takis Panoulias
 Kostas Keramidas
 Thanasis Skourtopoulos

Sources
"Απ' τις αλάνες της Ε.Σ.Κ.Α. στα παρκέ της A1-The History of Egaleo Men Basketball Team 1956–2008", Nikos D. Nikolaidis, "Emvryo" Publications, 2008, .

References

External links
Official website 
Eurobasket.com Team Page

Basketball teams established in 1956
Basketball teams in Greece